European Journal of Entomology (EJE) is a quarterly peer-reviewed open access scientific journal published by the Czech Academy of Sciences. It covers research in entomology, including Myriapoda, Chelicerata, and terrestrial Crustacea. It was established in 1904 by the Czech Entomological Society under the title Acta Societatis Entomologicae Bohemiae, then later as Acta Entomologica Bohemoslovaca. The insect depicted on the cover of the journal is Pyrrhocoris apterus. According to the Journal Citation Reports, the journal has a 2011 impact factor of 1.061. In 2016, the journal became electronic-only and open access.

References

External links
 

Entomology journals and magazines
Publications established in 1904
Creative Commons Attribution-licensed journals
English-language journals
Open access journals
Quarterly journals
Academic journals published by learned and professional societies